Lovely By Surprise is a 2007 film directed by Kirt Gunn. It stars Carrie Preston, Michael Chernus, Austin Pendleton and Reg Rogers.

Synopsis of plot 

Facing an intense bout of writer's block, novelist Marian Walker (Carrie Preston) seeks advice from her mentor and ex-lover (Austin Pendleton).  He gives her some innocent advice: kill off Humkin (Michael Chernus), the book's protagonist.  Marian tries to write the death scene, but this proves complicated: Humkin survives, escapes, and starts to appear outside of the confines of the story.

Promotional webisodes 
In 2006 two websites, Lovely By Surprise and The Neverything, were launched as teasers for the film.  Each website told a different strand of the film's story through one-minute "webisode" installments over a period of weeks.

External links 
International Sales Agent's site
Official movie site

American independent films
2007 films
2000s English-language films
2000s American films